Makerere University College of Health Sciences (MakCHS), is one of the 10 colleges that constitute Makerere University, East Africa,s oldest university. The college was established in 2007 by consolidating the training offered by the University in the disciplines of Medicine, Dentistry, Pharmacy, Nursing, Public Health, Optometry, Radiography and other health sciences. The college of Health Sciences consists of 5 schools: School of Medicine, School of Public Health, School of Biomedical Sciences, School of Dentistry and School og Health Sciences. The college provides training in the health sciences at the undergraduate, masters, PhD and post- doctoral levels levels.

Location
The school's campus is located on Mulago Hill between the new and old mulago, in northeast Kampala, Uganda's capital and largest city. The location is adjacent to Mulago Hospital Complex, the teaching hospital of Makerere University. The coordinates of the school are: 00° 20' 17"N, 32° 34' 34"S (Latitude:0.3380, Longitude:32.5760)

Overview
Makerere University College of Health Sciences ( MakCHS) is one of the 10 colleges that constitute Makerere University. The schools of the college include:

 Makerere University School of Biomedical Sciences
 Makerere University School of Health Sciences
 Makerere University School of Medicine
 Makerere University School of Public Health
 Makerere University School of Dentistry

The College is headed by a Principal and a Deputy Principal, while each School is headed by a Dean.

DepartmentsMakerere University College of Health Sciences has 30 Departments

 Department of Anaesthesia 
 Department of Family Medicine
 Department of Internal Medicine
 Department of Surgery
 Department of Paediatrics
 Department of Radiology and Radiotherapy
 Department of Ear, Nose and Throat
 Department of Orthopedic Surgery
 Department of Ophthalmology
 Department of Psychiatry
 Department of Anatomy
 Department of Physiology
 Department of Biochemistry
 Department of Pharmacology
 Department of Pathology
 Department of Medical Microbiology
 Department of Immunology and Molecular Biology
 Department of Medical Illustration
Department of Pharmacy
 Department of Dentistry
 Department of Nursing
 Department of Allied Health Sciences (Radiology, Physical Therapy, Occupational Therapy, Medical Laboratory Technology)

Undergraduate Courses
The following undergraduate courses are offered at Makerere University School of Health Sciences:

 Diploma in Dentistry
 Diploma in Medical Laboratory Technology
 Diploma in Midwifery 
 Diploma in Nursing
 Diploma in Radiology
 Diploma in Physiotherapy
 Diploma in Pharmacy
 Bachelor of Science in Nursing (BSN)
 Bachelor of Pharmacy (BPharm)
 Bachelor of Dental Surgery (BDS)
 Bachelor of Science (BSc) in Occupational Therapy
 Bachelor of Science (BSc) in Physiotherapy

Graduate Courses
The following postgraduate courses are offered at Makerere University School of Health Sciences:

 Master of Science (MSc) in Occupational Therapy
 Master of Science (MSc) in Physical Therapy
 Master of Science in Nursing (MSN)
 Master of Dental Surgery (MDS)
 Master of Pharmacy (MPharm)
 Doctor of Philosophy (PhD)

External links
 Makerere University Homepage
  Makerere University College of Health Sciences Homepage

See also
 Education in Uganda
 Makerere University
 Makerere University College of Health Sciences
 Makerere University School of Biomedical Sciences
 Makerere University School of Medicine
 Makerere University School of Public Health

References

Makerere University